Valery Antonovich Makharadze (1940–2008) was a politician in Russia who held a number of senior posts during the presidency of Boris Yeltsin, including deputy prime minister. He was removed from the latter office with the dissolution of the cabinet of Boris Yeltsin and Yegor Gaidar and the creation of Viktor Chernomyrdin's first cabinet.

Career in government
Under the USSR, Makharadze served as the chairman of the Volgograd Oblast soviet.

In 1991, Makharadze's role was to manage the relations between the federal government and the various regional administrations of Russia, as a member of Boris Yeltsin's team. He was also involved in removing former Communist officials for suspected corruption as the Yeltsin administration's chief inspector, including what was referred to as "nomenklatura privatization." In March 1992 he was appointed as one of the Deputy Prime Ministers in Yeltsin's cabinet, being in charge of managing relations between the regions and the government in Moscow. As part of this, Makharadze and nationality minister Valery Tishkov signed an agreement with the German government to help resettle Volga Germans in their native region. Among his other tasks was to oversee the implementation of economic reforms begun by the central government in the regions. However, when Boris Yeltsin was making concessions to conservative opposition factions in order to gain approval for his economic privatization policies, despite the resignation of Deputy Prime Minister Mikhail Poltoranin it was expected the Makharadze would be forced to resign too. He suggested during this time that a stronger presidential administration was needed. Makharadze was removed from the position of deputy prime minister in December 1992, upon the formation of the new cabinet.

He later worked at the Russian embassy in Canada as a trade and commercial attaché, until at least 2003.

Sources

References

Books
 
 

1940 births
2008 deaths
People from Makhachkala
20th-century Russian politicians
Deputy heads of government of the Russian Federation
Russian diplomats
Russian people of Georgian descent
Soviet politicians